Thitarodes yeriensis is a species of moth of the family Hepialidae. It was described by Liang in 1995, and is known from Yunnan, China.

References

External links
Hepialidae genera

Moths described in 1995
Hepialidae